Toni Lüdi (born 1945) is a German art director and academic. Along with his wife Heidi Lüdi he established himself in the 1970s as one of the leading set designers of New German Cinema.

Selected filmography
 Germany in Autumn (1978)
 Panic Time (1980)
 Der Preis fürs Überleben (1980)
 In the Heart of the Hurricane (1980)
 The Magic Mountain (1982)
  (1983)
  (1983)
  (1984)

References

Bibliography
Hans-Michael Bock and Tim Bergfelder. The Concise Cinegraph: An Encyclopedia of German Cinema. Berghahn Books, 2009.

External links

1945 births
Living people
German art directors
Swiss art directors